Zhuqi Township or Jhuci Township is a rural township in Chiayi County, Taiwan.

Geography

Administrative divisions
The township comprises the villages of Baiqi, Duanru, Fujin, Guanghua, Heping, Jinshi, Kengtou, Longshan, Luman, Neipu, Renshou, Shakeng, Shengping, Shiye, Tangxing, Taoyuan, Wanqiao, Wenfeng, Yihe, Yilong, Yiren, Zhonghe, Zhuqi and Ziyun.

Tourist attractions
 Bamboo Museum
 Dulishan National Trail
 Fenchihu Old Street
 Fencihu Scenic Area
 Guanyin Waterfall Scenic Area
 Hongjing Bridge
 Millennium Suspension Bridge
 Train Museum
 Yuantan River Wildlife Conservation Water Park
 Yuntan Waterfalls
 Zhuqi Park

Transportation

The township is accessible from Lumachan Station, Zhuqi Station, Mululiao Station, Zhangnaoliao Station, Dulishan Station, Jiaoliping Station, Shuisheliao Station and Fenqihu Station of the Alishan Forest Railway.

Notable natives
 Chiu Hsien-chih, Chairperson of New Power Party

References

External links

 Jhuci Township Office 

Townships in Chiayi County